Adam Jánoš (born 20 July 1992) is a Czech football player who currently plays for Bohemians 1905. He has represented his country at youth international level.

Career statistics

International

References

External links
 
 

1992 births
Living people
People from Uherské Hradiště
Czech footballers
Czech Republic youth international footballers
Czech Republic under-21 international footballers
Czech Republic international footballers
Czech First League players
FC Baník Ostrava players
AC Sparta Prague players
FC Vysočina Jihlava players
FK Mladá Boleslav players
Association football midfielders
MFK Karviná players
Sportspeople from the Zlín Region
Bohemians 1905 players